Victoria is a city in Carver County, Minnesota, United States. The population was 10,546 at the 2020 census.

Geography

State Highways 5 and 7 are two of Victoria's main routes.

Victoria is also home to the  Carver Park Reserve.

In the 1850s, Victoria's rich soil attracted many farmers from Germany, Switzerland, and the Netherlands.

History
Michael Diethelm is believed to be the first settler in Victoria after setting up a shelter for his wife and two children in 1851 near the present-day St. Victoria Church. A year later, steamboats from St. Paul began bringing in additional supplies for early settlers. The settlement continued to grow as the rich soil attracted farmers. Also in 1858, the Laketown Moravian Brethren's Church was established and is now on the National Register of Historic Places. Eventually the steamboats to Chaska and the St. Paul railroad helped transform the area into a thriving community.

Demographics

2010 census
As of the census of 2010, there were 7,345 people, 2,435 households, and 2,055 families living in the city. The racial makeup of the city was 95.6% White, 0.5% African American, 0.1% Native American, 2.0% Asian, 0.3% from other races, and 1.5% from two or more races. Hispanic or Latino of any race were 2.0% of the population.

There were 2,435 households, of which 49.4% had children under the age of 18 living with them, 76.7% were married couples living together, 5.4% had a female householder with no husband present, 2.3% had a male householder with no wife present, and 15.6% were non-families. 12.6% of all households were made up of individuals, and 4.3% had someone living alone who was 65 years of age or older. The average household size was 2.99 and the average family size was 3.27.

The median age in the city was 38.9 years. 32.9% of residents were under the age of 18; 4.5% were between the ages of 18 and 24; 25.5% were from 25 to 44; 28.6% were from 45 to 64; and 8.5% were 65 years of age or older. The gender makeup of the city was 49.7% male and 50.3% female.

2000 census
As of the census of 2000, there were 4,025 people, 1,367 households, and 1,141 families living in the city. The racial makeup of the city was 97.91% White, 0.27% African American, 0.12% Native American, 0.84% Asian, 0.37% from other races, and 0.47% from two or more races. Hispanic or Latino of any race were 0.99% of the population.

There were 1,367 households, out of which 47.0% had children under the age of 18 living with them, 76.0% were married couples living together, 5.3% had a female householder with no husband present, and 16.5% were non-families. 11.3% of all households were made up of individuals, and 3.4% had someone living alone who was 65 years of age or older. The average household size was 2.90 and the average family size was 3.17.

In the city, the population was spread out, with 31.7% under the age of 18, 4.2% from 18 to 24, 33.5% from 25 to 44, 24.0% from 45 to 64, and 6.6% who were 65 years of age or older. The median age was 36 years. For every 100 females, there were 99.4 males. For every 100 females age 18 and over, there were 97.8 males.

The median income for a household in the city was $86,772, and the median income for a family was $91,681. Males had a median income of $60,931 versus $34,519 for females. The per capita income for the city was $38,929. About 1.3% of families and 2.3% of the population were below the poverty line, including 2.1% of those under age 18 and 2.2% of those age 65 or over.

Politics

Education
District 112 schools have an elementary school, Victoria Elementary.

Chanhassen High School serves the majority of Victoria.

Waconia Public Schools operates area public schools serving other parts of Victoria, including Waconia High School.

The city is home to the co-ed college preparatory high school Holy Family Catholic High School.

References

Cities in Carver County, Minnesota
Cities in Minnesota